The Integrated Resource Plan (IRP) is a plan aimed at estimating South Africa's electricity demand. It takes into account how the demand of electricity will be met and the expense of such a demand. The plan refers to electricity generation and expansion programmes. In formulating the National Development Plan, the Department of Energy gazetted the Integrated Resource Plan 2010-2030 (IRP 2010) in March 2011; this forecasted the energy demand for the 20-year period. In October 2019, IRP 2019 was gazetted; this updates the energy forecast from 2019 to the year 2030.

Objectives 
The IRP was indicated to be a living document that would be revised and updated regularly. An updated plan was released in 2019, after the first in IRP in 2011. The stated objectives of the IRP are:

 Make electricity inexpensive
 Reduce green house gas emissions
 Reduce water usage
 Electricity generation from different sources

History 
As of IRP 2019, 6 422 MW have been procured by the Renewable Energy Independent Power Producer Procurement Programme, of which 3 876 MW are in use on the country's electrical grid. The following capacity has been commissioned as part of Eskom's build programme: 1 332 MW at Ingula Pumped Storage Scheme, 1 588 MW at Medupi, 800 MW at Kusile, and 100 MW at Sere Wind Farm. In total, 18 000 MW have been resourced as additional capacity.

See also

 Energy in South Africa
Renewable energy in South Africa
Solar power in South Africa
 Renewable Energy Independent Power Producers Procurement Programme

References 

Renewable energy in South Africa